"Cruising Down the River" is a 1946 popular recording song, which became the winner of a public songwriting competition held in the UK. Words and music were entered by two middle-aged women named Eily Beadell and Nell Tollerton. The words had been written by Eily in the 1920s, and the melody composed by music hall artist Ena Dayne; as she could not read music, it was transcribed by Tollerton. It was sung in concert parties throughout the 1930s, mainly by Charles Ray. One of the original early recordings of this song, issued in the UK in January 1946 on the Columbia record label (FB 3180), was by Lou Preager and his Orchestra, with vocals by Paul Rich. This was immensely popular on radio, with record and sheet music sales making it one of the biggest hits of 1946 in the United Kingdom.

The recording by Russ Morgan was released by Decca Records as catalog number 24568. It first reached the Billboard magazine Best Seller chart on February 18, 1949, and lasted 22 weeks on the chart, peaking at No. 1. The song became one of the biggest hits of his career, as well as one of his signature songs. The recording was actually a two-sided hit, as the flip side, "Sunflower," also reached No. 10 on the chart.

The recording by Blue Barron was released by MGM Records as catalog number 10346. It first reached the Billboard magazine Best Seller chart on January 21, 1949, and lasted 19 weeks on the chart, peaking at No. 1.

The recording by Jack Smith was released by Capitol Records as catalog number 15372. It first reached the Billboard magazine Best Seller chart on February 25, 1949, and lasted 11 weeks on the chart, peaking at No. 14.

The recording by Primo Scala and the Keynotes was released by London Records as catalog number 356. It reached the Billboard magazine Best Seller chart on March 4, 1949, at No. 27, its only week on the chart.

The recording by Frankie Carle was released by Columbia Records as catalog number 38411. It reached the Billboard magazine Best Seller chart on April 22, 1949, at No. 28, its only week on the chart.

It has been covered numerous times by various artists, including Connie Francis on her 1959 album My Thanks to You.

The song was sung by Dick Haymes in the 1953 film Cruisin' Down the River.

References

1946 songs